Space jet or spacejet or variation, may refer to:

 Mitsubishi SpaceJet, a failed project of a regional jet aircraft
 Club 328 (ICAO airline code: SDJ; callsign: SPACEJET), a UK charter airline

 KelliCraft Space Jet, a model airplane powered by Jetex
 Spaceplane, a spacecraft in the form of an airplane, sometimes called space jets in popular media and fiction
 Astrophysical jet, a jet in space, a jet that is an astronomical feature in deep space

See also

 Hand-held maneuvering unit, an astronaut maneuvering device for spacewalks that is a jet gun
 Reaction engine, including space thrusters that uses jets of propellant
 MiGFlug, a company offering "space jet flights", flights to the "edge of space"
 SpiceJet (IATA airline code: SG; ICAO airline code: SEJ) Indian airline
 Batik Air, an Indonesian airline initially named Space Jet
 Jet space
 
 
 Space (disambiguation)
 Jet (disambiguation)